Nicholas James Wittgren (born May 29, 1991) is an American professional baseball pitcher in the Kansas City Royals organization. He has previously played in Major League Baseball (MLB) for the Miami Marlins, Cleveland Indians, and St. Louis Cardinals.

Amateur career
Wittgren was born in Torrance, California, but grew up in Lafayette, Indiana where he attended McCutcheon High School and played for the school's baseball, basketball, and tennis teams. Wittgren played college baseball at Parkland College for a year before transferring to Purdue University where he played from 2011 to 2012. He served as the closer for Purdue during his two years, finishing with a 2.54 earned run average (ERA), 22 saves and 94 strikeouts over 92  innings pitched. In 2011, he played collegiate summer baseball with the Hyannis Harbor Hawks of the Cape Cod Baseball League.

Professional career

Miami Marlins

Wittgren was drafted by the Miami Marlins in the ninth round of the 2012 Major League Baseball draft. During his first professional season he had a 1.17 ERA, 13 saves and 47 strikeouts over  innings while playing for the Jamestown Jammers and Greensboro Grasshoppers. He started the 2013 season with the Jupiter Hammerheads and was promoted to the Double-A Jacksonville Suns. At the end of the season he was named the Minor League Relief Pitcher of the Year by the staff of MiLB.com. Wittgren returned to Jacksonville in 2014. He appeared in 52 games and had a 3.55 ERA, 20 saves and 56 strikeouts over 66 innings. He again returned to Jacksonville to start 2015, but was promoted to the Triple-A New Orleans Zephyrs after two games.

The Marlins promoted Wittgren to the major leagues on April 19, 2016. In his first Major League appearance, he walked the only batter he faced, Anthony Rendon. Rendon later scored on Bryce Harper's grand slam. He spent most of the season in the Marlins bullpen, appearing in 48 games. He had a 3.14 ERA in  innings. The next season he spent time between the AAA level and the Marlins bullpen, appearing in 38 games with a 4.68 ERA in  innings. Wittgren was designated for assignment on January 29, 2019 following the signing of Neil Walker.

Cleveland Indians
On February 4, 2019, Wittgren was traded to the Cleveland Indians in exchange for Jordan Milbrath. On March 24, 2019, Wittgren was optioned to the AAA Columbus Clippers. On April 9, 2019, he was called up to the Indians after Mike Clevinger went to the 10-day IL.

With the 2020 Cleveland Indians, Wittgren appeared in 25 games, compiling a 2-0 record with 3.42 ERA and 28 strikeouts in 23.2 innings pitched.

Wittgren made 60 appearances in 2021, posting a 5.05 ERA and 61 strikeouts.

On November 5, 2021, the Indians outrighted Wittgren off their 40-man roster; Wittgren subsequently elected free agency.

St. Louis Cardinals
On March 13, 2022, Wittgren signed a one-year contract with the St. Louis Cardinals. After recording a 5.90 ERA in a team-leading 29 appearances for the Cardinals, Wittgren was designated for assignment on July 2. Wittgren was released on July 9.

Kansas City Royals
On December 23, 2022, Wittgren signed a minor league deal with the Kansas City Royals.

International career
Wittgren was selected to represent Germany at the 2023 World Baseball Classic qualification.

Personal life
Wittgren and his wife, Ashley, have two sons together. They met in 2011 while Wittgren was playing in the Cape Cod Baseball League, where Ashley worked. She has a master's degree in strength and conditioning, and is Wittgren's personal trainer during the off-season.

References

External links

Purdue Boilermakers bio

1991 births
Living people
Baseball players from Torrance, California
Major League Baseball pitchers
Miami Marlins players
Cleveland Indians players
St. Louis Cardinals players
Purdue Boilermakers baseball players
Hyannis Harbor Hawks players
Jamestown Jammers players
Greensboro Grasshoppers players
Jupiter Hammerheads players
Jacksonville Suns players
Glendale Desert Dogs players
New Orleans Zephyrs players
New Orleans Baby Cakes players
Columbus Clippers players
Parkland Cobras baseball players